The 39th Edition Vuelta a España (Tour of Spain), a long-distance bicycle stage race and one of the 3 Grand Tours, was held from 17 April to 6 May 1984. It consisted of 19 stages covering a total of 3,593 km, and was won by Éric Caritoux of the Skil–Sem cycling team. It was one of the most surprising grand tour victories in cycling history as Caritoux, a virtual unknown who was part of a lineup that was thrown together at the last minute, won by the closest margin in history.

Caritoux, a second year professional, had shown his climbing talent earlier that year by winning the stage up the Mont-Ventoux of the 1984 Paris–Nice but he did not enter the 1984 Vuelta a España thinking of the overall classification.

On stage 8 Roger De Vlaeminck, one of the oldest riders professionally, won the first Vuelta stage of his career which gave him a stage win in all three grand tours. Fourteen years earlier he won his first grand tour stage during the 1970 Tour de France and had won 22 Giro stages in between. On the 12th stage to Lagos de Covadonga an area in Asturias which includes one of the most important climbs of the Vuelta, Caritoux finished second behind the German Raimund Dietzen. Caritoux took the leader's jersey from Pedro Delgado. Alberto Fernández was 32 seconds behind Caritoux in the general classification at that stage. Fernández had been third the year previously in the Vuelta a España and in the Giro d'Italia. On the stage 14 mountain time trial, Caritoux lost five seconds. Caritoux lost further time in the final individual time trial but still managed to finish the race with a slender lead of six seconds over Fernández, the smallest margin in the history of the Vuelta a España, and also the smallest ever seen in a Grand Tour. Fernández died later on in 1984.

Teams

Thirteen teams were invited by the race organizers to participate in the 1984 edition of the Vuelta a España, six of which were based outside of Spain. Each team sent a squad of ten riders, meaning that the race started with a peloton of 130 cyclists. From the riders that began the race, 97 made it to the finish in Madrid.

The teams entering the race were:

Route and stages

Two of these thirteen stages had summit finishes: stage 7, to Rassos de Peguera; and stage 12, to Lagos de Enol. Another stage with a mountain-top finish was stage 14, which consisted of a climbing time trial to Monte Narasco. The organizers chose to include no rest days. When compared to the previous year's race, the race was  longer and contained the same amount of time trials, stages, and rest days.

Classification leadership

Three different jerseys were worn during the 1984 Vuelta a España. The leader of the general classification – calculated by adding the stage finish times of each rider, and allowing time bonuses for the first three finishers on mass-start stages – wore a golden jersey. This classification is the most important of the race, and its winner is considered as the winner of the Vuelta.

For the points classification, which awarded a light blue jersey to its leader, cyclists were given points for finishing a stage in the top 15; additional points could also be won in intermediate sprints. The green jersey was awarded to the mountains classification leader. In this ranking, points were won by reaching the summit of a climb ahead of other cyclists. Each climb was ranked as either first, second or third category, with more points available for higher category climbs. The leader of the mountains classification wore a green jersey.

Although no jersey was awarded, there was also one classification for the teams, in which the stage finish times of the best three cyclists per team were added; the leading team was the one with the lowest total time.

The rows in the following table correspond to the jerseys awarded after that stage was run.

Final standings

General classification

Points classification

Mountains classification

Team classification

Intermediate sprints classification

Special sprints classification

References

 
1984 in road cycling
1984
1984 in Spanish sport
Vuelta a España
Vuelta a España
1984 Super Prestige Pernod